KIJR-LP was a low-power television station licensed to Lucerne Valley, California, United States. KIJR-LP operated on UHF channel 30 and is owned by Sima Birach's Birach Broadcasting Corporation.

The station's license was cancelled on July 8, 2022, for failing to file an application for digital operation before its construction permit expired.

References

External links

Television channels and stations established in 1989
1989 establishments in California
Defunct television stations in the United States
IJR-LP
Television channels and stations disestablished in 2022
2022 disestablishments in California